White County is a county located in the U.S. state of Arkansas. As of the 2020 census, the population was 76,822. The county seat is Searcy. White County is Arkansas's 31st county, formed on October 23, 1835, from portions of Independence, Jackson, and Pulaski counties and named for Hugh Lawson White, a Whig candidate for President of the United States. It is an alcohol prohibition or dry county, though a few private establishments (such as the Searcy Country Club, and Veterans of Foreign Wars posts in Searcy and Beebe) can serve alcohol.

White County comprises the Searcy, AR Micropolitan Statistical Area, which is also included in the Little Rock-North Little Rock, AR Combined Statistical Area.

History
On May 17, 1862, White County was the site of the Little Red Skirmish between Union Major General Samuel J Curtis and a force of about 100 loosely-organized Confederates, followed by the battle at Whitney Lane in June. also known as The Skirmish at Searcy Landing.

Geography
It is the second-largest county by area in Arkansas.

Major highways

  Future Interstate 57
  U.S. Highway 64
  U.S. Highway 67
  U.S. Highway 167
  Highway 5
  Highway 11
  Highway 13
  Highway 16
  Highway 31
  Highway 36
  Highway 87
  Highway 110
  Highway 124
  Highway 157
  Highway 258
  Highway 267
  Highway 305
  Highway 310
  Highway 320
  Highway 321
  Highway 323
  Highway 367
  Highway 385

Adjacent counties
 Independence County (north)
 Jackson County (northeast)
 Woodruff County (east)
 Prairie County (southeast)
 Lonoke County (southwest)
 Faulkner County (west)
 Cleburne County (northwest)

National and state protected areas
 Bald Knob National Wildlife Refuge
 Henry Gray / Hurricane Lake Wildlife Management Area

Demographics

2020 census

As of the 2020 United States census, there were 76,822 people, 28,621 households, and 18,028 families residing in the county.

2000 census
As of the 2000 United States Census, there were 67,165 people, 25,148 households, and 18,408 families residing in the county. There were 27,613 housing units at an average density of 27 per square mile (10/km2). The racial makeup of the county was 93.52% White, 3.56% Black or African American, 0.43% Native American, 0.32% Asian, 0.03% Pacific Islander, 0.82% from other races, and 1.31% from two or more races.  1.88% of the population were Hispanic or Latino of any race.

There were 25,148 households, out of which 33.00% had children under the age of 18 living with them, 59.90% were married couples living together, 9.50% had a female householder with no husband present, and 26.80% were non-families. 23.40% of all households were made up of individuals, and 10.50% had someone living alone who was 65 years of age or older.  The average household size was 2.53 and the average family size was 2.98.

In the county, the population was spread out, with 24.40% under the age of 18, 12.80% from 18 to 24, 27.20% from 25 to 44, 21.90% from 45 to 64, and 13.80% who were 65 years of age or older.  The median age was 35 years. For every 100 females, there were 95.20 males.  For every 100 females age 18 and over, there were 92.90 males.

The median income for a household in the county was $32,203, and the median income for a family was $38,782. Males had a median income of $29,884 versus $20,323 for females. The per capita income for the county was $15,890.  About 10.40% of families and 14.00% of the population were below the poverty line, including 18.10% of those under age 18 and 14.30% of those age 65 or over.

Government
In 1988, White County elected virtually an entire slate of Republicans to county offices. Though such Republican sweeps had frequently occurred in northern and northwestern Arkansas, White County was the first in the Little Rock area to turn to Republican as the party steadily made inroads toward a two-party system.
A portion of White County is represented in the Arkansas State Senate by the Republican Ronald R. Caldwell, a real estate businessman from Wynne in Cross County. The 45th and current White County Judge is Michael Lincoln of Searcy, who assumed office in January 2007.
Over the past few election cycles White County has trended heavily towards the GOP. The last Democrat (as of 2020) to carry this county was Bill Clinton in 1996.

Economy
One of the state's largest banks, First Security Bank, was established in Searcy in 1932 as Security Bank. First Security now has over $8 billion in assets and 78 locations in Arkansas.

The first Wal-Mart distribution center away from the corporate headquarters in Bentonville was established in Searcy.

Education

Public education
Public education is provided by several public school districts including:

Private education

Colleges and universities
Arkansas State University-Beebe Public, established in 1927 as The Junior Agricultural School of Central Arkansas.
Arkansas State University-Searcy A technical branch of Arkansas State University
Harding University Private, Churches of Christ enrollment over 6000.

Communities

Cities

 Bald Knob
 Beebe
 Bradford
 Judsonia
 Kensett
 McRae
 Pangburn
 Searcy (county seat)

Towns

 Garner
 Georgetown
 Griffithville
 Higginson
 Letona
 Rose Bud
 Russell
 West Point

Unincorporated communities

 Albion — north-central White County, between Four Mile Hill or "Boothill" and Pangburn, and north of Letona, along Arkansas Highway 16 and surrounding county roads
 Antioch — western White County, north of Beebe, along Arkansas Highways 31 and 267 and surrounding county roads
 Andrews
 Bare Stone
 Barrentine Corner
 Bee Rock
 Belcher
 Center Hill — central White County, approximately 8 miles west of Searcy, situated along Arkansas Highway 36 and 305 and surrounding county roads
 Clay
 Conant
 Crosby
 Dewey
 Dogwood
 Doniphan
 El Paso — southwestern White County, situated along Arkansas Highway 5 and U.S. Highway 64 West
 Enright
 Essex
 Floyd — western White County, approximately 8 miles southeast of Romance, along Arkansas Highways 31 and 305 and surrounding county roads
 Four Mile Hill or "Boot Hill" — central White County, northwest of Searcy and southeast of Albion, along Arkansas Highway 16 and surrounding county roads
 Georgia Ridge – home community of Arkansas State Representative Charlotte Douglas of District 75 in Crawford County
 Gravel Hill — western White County, northwest of Floyd and south of Joy, situated between Arkansas Highways 31 and 36 along Gravel Hill Road and surrounding county roads
 Hammondsville – western White County, between Romance and El Paso, primarily situated along Hammons Chapel Road (connecting Highway 5 and El Paso Road)
 Happy
 Harmony — central White County, southwest of Center Hill, situated along Arkansas Highway 305 and surrounding county roads
 Hart
 Hickory Flat
 Holly Springs
 Joy — central White County, between Rose Bud and Center Hill, situated along Arkansas Highway 36 and surrounding county roads
 Keeler Corner
 Liberty Valley — eastern White County, between Bald Knob and the White River, along U.S. Highway 64 East and surrounding county roads
 Little Red
 Midway
 Mitchell Corner
 Morning Sun — annexed to Higginson in 2008
 Nimmo
 Opal — southwestern White County, between El Paso and Beebe, along U.S. Highway 64 West and Opal Road and surrounding county roads
 Pickens — north-central White County, between Sidon and Letona, along Arkansas Highway 310 (Pickens Chapel Road) and Pickens Road and surrounding county roads
 Plainview — northeastern White County, north of Judsonia, along Arkansas Highways 157 and 385 and surrounding county roads
 Pryor
 Providence — northeastern White County, north of Judsonia and northwest of Bald Knob, along Arkansas Highways 157 and 258 and surrounding county roads; site of White County Central Schools
 Rio Vista
 Romance — western White County, between Rose Bud and El Paso, along Arkansas Highways 5 and 31 and surrounding county roads
 Showalter's Corner
 Sidon — north-central White County, west of Pickens and north of Joy, along Arkansas Highway 310 and surrounding county roads
 Smyrna
 Steprock
 Sunnydale
 Twentythree
 Velvet Ridge — northeastern White County, north of Bald Knob, along U.S. Highway 167 and surrounding county roads
 Vinity Corner — south-central White County, south of Garner and southeast of McRae, along West Vinity Road, North Vinity Road, and other county roads southeast of Arkansas Highway 367
 Walker — southeastern White County, south of Higginson and west of Griffithville, along Arkansas Highway 11 (Walker Road) and surrounding county roads
 Worden
 Wright's Corner

Historic towns

 Beeler Ferry
 Bethel Grove
 Denmark
 Jasmine
 Mount Pisgah
 Old Stoney Point
 Roosevelt
 Russell
 Union Hill

Townships

 Albion
 Antioch
 Bald Knob (Bald Knob)
 Big Creek (Pangburn)
 Cadron
 Cane
 Chrisp
 Clay
 Cleveland
 Coffey
 Coldwell
 Crosby
 Cypert
 Denmark
 Des Arc
 Dogwood (Griffithville)
 El Paso
 Francure (Georgetown)
 Garner (Garner)
 Gravel Hill
 Gray (most of Searcy, part of Kensett)
 Gum Springs (part of Searcy)
 Guthrie
 Harrison (most of Judsonia, part of Searcy)
 Hartsell Township
 Higginson Township (Higginson, part of Searcy)
 Jackson
 Jefferson
 Joy
 Kensett (most of Kensett, small part of Searcy)
 Kentucky (Rose Bud)
 Liberty (Bradford)
 McRae (McRae)
 Marion (Letona)
 Marshall
 Mount Pisgah
 Red River (West Point, part of Judsonia)
 Royal
 Russell (Russell)
 Union (Beebe)
 Velvet Ridge
 Walker

Source:

See also
 Crow Lake (Arkansas)
 List of lakes in White County, Arkansas
 National Register of Historic Places listings in White County, Arkansas

References

External links
 White County, Arkansas entry on the Encyclopedia of Arkansas History & Culture
 White County Historical Society
 White County official website

 
1835 establishments in Arkansas Territory
Populated places established in 1835
Little Rock–North Little Rock–Conway metropolitan area